In Greek mythology, Hyettus ( - Hyettos) was a native of Argos thought to have been the first man ever to have exacted vengeance over adultery: he reputedly killed Molurus, whom he had caught with his wife, and was sent into exile. King Orchomenus of Boeotia received him hospitably and assigned to him some land, where the village Hyettus was subsequently founded and named after him.

Notes

Mythology of Argos
Boeotian mythology
Sexual fidelity

References 

 Pausanias, Description of Greece with an English Translation by W.H.S. Jones, Litt.D., and H.A. Ormerod, M.A., in 4 Volumes. Cambridge, MA, Harvard University Press; London, William Heinemann Ltd. 1918. . Online version at the Perseus Digital Library
 Pausanias, Graeciae Descriptio. 3 vols. Leipzig, Teubner. 1903.  Greek text available at the Perseus Digital Library.
 Stephanus of Byzantium, Stephani Byzantii Ethnicorum quae supersunt, edited by August Meineike (1790-1870), published 1849. A few entries from this important ancient handbook of place names have been translated by Brady Kiesling. Online version at the Topos Text Project.

Characters in Greek mythology